Tee, tees, or TEE may refer to:

Common meaning

Tee, an item of sports equipment, used a.o. in golf
Tee language, a language spoken in Nigeria
tee (command), a shell command in various operating systems
Tee (symbol), symbol used in mathematics, logic and computer science
T-shirt, or tee

As an acronym

Tertiary Entrance Exam, an important exam for high school students in Western Australia
Total energy expenditure, the total amount of energy an individual expends (usually per day)
Thromboembolism, ThromboEmbolic Event
Trans Europ Express, a former international train network in Europe
Trans-Europe Express (album), an album by the German electronic band Kraftwerk
Transesophageal echocardiogram, a medical test that creates two dimensional images of the heart
Trusted execution environment, an execution framework with a higher level of security than the main operating system itself
Faculty of Technology, Engineering and the Environment (Birmingham City University)
Theological Education by Extension

Places
Ben Tee, a Scottish mountain
Tees, Alberta, a hamlet in Alberta, Canada
River Tees, a river in northern England

Other uses
Tee (given name)
Tee (surname), Minnan romanization of the common Asian surname Zheng
Tee, a traditional method of exchange in Enga Province, Papua New Guinea
Teeing ground, part of a golf course from where each golfer plays his first shot at each hole
Tee Pee Records, a record label
Tee Productions, a record label
Tee Records, a record label
Tee, also known as Ofisa Toleafoa, a competitor on the X Factor Australia 2014

See also

T (disambiguation)
TE (disambiguation)
T, a letter of the alphabet
T-shirt, an item of apparel
Plumbing fittings for the pipe fitting that looks like the letter "T".
Teee Sanders (born 1968) volleyball player

Trans Europ Express (disambiguation)